Cuckoo Rock may refer to:
Carfury Standing Stone, a standing stone near Penzance, Cornwall, also known as Cuckoo Rock
Cuckoo Rock, Dartmoor, a boulder on Dartmoor, Devon
Cuckoo Rock to Turbot Point, a Site of Special Scientific Interest in Roseland, Cornwall